The Nikon D60 is a 10.2-megapixel Nikon F-mount digital single-lens reflex camera announced in January 2008. The D60 succeeds the entry-level Nikon D40x.  It features the Nikon EXPEED image processor introduced in the higher-end Nikon D3 and D300.

Like a number of other entry-level Nikon DSLRs, the D60 has no in-body autofocus motor, and fully automatic autofocus requires the use of a lens with an integrated autofocus-motor. With any other lenses the camera's electronic rangefinder  can be used to manually adjust focus.

New features
Compared to the D40, new features of the Nikon D60 include:
Stop-motion movie creation
Nikon EI-137 processor (same as D3000, D80, D40x, D40)
Self-cleaning sensor unit
Air-flow Control System that reduces the amount of dust that reaches the sensor
LCD Screen Orientation Rotation
Active D-Lighting (one level)
Kit lens with optical image stabilization for same kit price as D40 before the Nikon D60 was released on February 24, 2008.
Manual flipping built-in flash with GN 12/39 (meters/feet) at ISO 100, 1/200 second maximum x-sync speed and has combination of auto, red eye reduction, slow sync and rear curtain, but not capable to be a Commander in Nikon's Wireless Lighting System.

Continuity
The Nikon D60 body is very similar to the Nikon D40, with the placement of several key buttons being the most notable difference. Like the D40, the Nikon D60 has no secondary display on top of the body (common in higher-end DSLRs), but instead displays shutter speed, f-number, and other information on the main LCD screen.

Reception
Digital Photography Review said that the D60 is more of a "subtle upgrade" to the D40 and praised its boost in performance, and new features such as D-Lighting and the dust-reduction system. They criticized the lack of mid-range features, such as a vertical grip and poor performance at high ISO when compared to Canon.

Ken Rockwell criticized the slower flash sync, more megapixels, and lower base ISO. However, he praised the camera's manual focus indicator, saying it was better than his D3.

Both Digital Photography Review and Rockwell noted that the lack of an in-body focus motor was not a problem due to the wide availability of AF-S lenses and their belief that serious photographers using more exotic Nikon glass would be shooting with a D200 or higher, not the D60.

See also
List of Nikon F-mount lenses with integrated autofocus motors

References

External links

 Nikon D60 – Nikon global website
 Nikon D60 – Nikon USA website
 Nikon D60 minisite @ Nikon

Cameras introduced in 2008
D60
D60